The Castello Planofficially entitled Afbeeldinge van de Stadt Amsterdam in Nieuw Neederlandt (Dutch, "Picture of the City of Amsterdam in New Netherland")is an early city map of what is now the Financial District of Lower Manhattan from an original of 1660. It was created by Jacques Cortelyou ( 1625–1693), a surveyor in what was then called New Amsterdamlater renamed by Province of New York settlement as New York City. The map that is presently in the New York Public Library is a copy created around 1665 to 1670 by an unknown draughtsman from a  lost Cortelyou original. 

Around 1667, cartographer Joan Blaeu (1596–1673) bound the existing plan to an atlas, together with other hand-crafted New Amsterdam depictions. He sold the atlas to Cosimo III de' Medici, Grand Duke of Tuscany. This transaction most likely happened in Amsterdam, the Netherlands, as it has yet to be proven that Blaeu ever set foot in New Netherland.

The plan remained in Italy, where in 1900 it was discovered at the Villa di Castello near Florence. It was printed in 1916 and received the name "Castello Plan" at that time.

It is covered extensively in Volume 2 of Isaac Newton Phelps Stokes' six-volume survey, The Iconography of Manhattan Island (1915–1928).

A Castello Plan Monument is installed at Lower Manhattan's Peter Minuit Plaza. On modern-day Cortelyou Road in Brooklyn's Ditmas Park neighborhood, there is a tavern named for The Castello Plan.

See also
 History of New York City
 Manatus Map
 Cartography of New York City

References

External links
 Iconography of Manhattan Island from Columbia University Libraries
 Overlay of the Castello Plan on current Manhattan
 List of property owners
 Zoomable version of  the Castello Plan
 3D model based on the Castello Plan
 New Amsterdam History Center
 The Castello Plan tavern

History of New York City
Maps of cities
New York (state) maps
17th-century maps and globes
Maps of New York City